The 2002 New Hampshire gubernatorial election was held on November 5, 2002. Three-term incumbent Democratic Governor Jeanne Shaheen opted to unsuccessfully run for the United States Senate rather than seek a fourth term as governor. Republican Craig Benson, a self-funded businessman, defeated Democrat Mark Fernald, a state senator, in the general election after both won contested primary elections.

This was the only time a Republican was elected governor between 1994 and 2016.

Democratic primary

Candidates
Mark Fernald, New Hampshire state senator
Bev Hollingworth, New Hampshire state senator

Results

Republican primary

Candidates
Craig Benson, businessman
Bruce Keough, former New Hampshire state senator
Gordon Humphrey, former U.S. senator, 2000 Republican nominee for governor
Robert Kingsbury, perennial candidate
Joe Haas
Bob Kroepel

Results

General election

Predictions

Results

See also
 U.S. Gubernatorial Elections, 2002

References

External links
 New Hampshire Secretary of State's office, election division

2002 United States gubernatorial elections
2002
Gubernatorial